Mirgul Moldoisaeva is a Kyrghyz diplomat who currently serves as Kyrgyz Republic Permanent Representative to United Nations.

Education 
Moldoisaeva was educated at International University of Kyrgyzstan where she obtained a bachelor’s degree in International Law in 2000 and a master’s degree in Civil Law from Kyrgyz State National University in 2003.

Career 
Moldoisaeva began her career as a Desk Officer in the foreign policy office of the Kyrgyz Republic relations with the Western countries and the United Nations and later in the office of the President of Kyrgyz Republic from 2005 to 2011. She served as Expert, Chief of the Situational and Analytical unit of the Foreign Policy Department in the office of  Kyrgyz President from 2011 to 2014, and served as the Head of the International Cooperation Department of the Government Office of the Kyrgyz Republic from 2014 to 2016, when she was appointed Permanent Representative to the United Nations.

References 

Permanent Representatives of Kyrgyzstan to the United Nations
Kyrgyzstani diplomats
Kyrgyzstani women diplomats